Alex Clark was an American Negro league outfielder in the 1930s.

Clark played for the Louisville White Sox in 1931. In 12 recorded games, he posted six hits with a home run in 44 plate appearances.

References

External links
 and Seamheads

Year of birth missing
Year of death missing
Place of birth missing
Place of death missing
Louisville White Sox players
Baseball outfielders